Men's Combined World Cup 1982/1983

Calendar

Final point standings

In Men's Combined World Cup 1982/83 all 5 results count.

Note:

Race 3, 4 and 5 races not all points were awarded (not enough finishers).

Men's Combined Team Results

bold indicate highest score - italics indicate race wins

World Cup
FIS Alpine Ski World Cup men's combined discipline titles